Authier is a municipality in northwestern Quebec, Canada, in the Abitibi-Ouest Regional County Municipality. It had a population of 282 in the Canada 2011 Census.

The municipality was constituted on September 20, 1918, and is named after Hector Authier (1881–1971).

Demographics
Population trend:
 Population in 2011: 282 (2006 to 2011 population change: 14.2%)
 Population in 2006: 247
 Population in 2001: 318
 Population in 1996: 324
 Population in 1991: 361

Private dwellings occupied by usual residents: 118 (total dwellings: 123)

Mother tongue:
 English as first language: 0%
 French as first language: 100%
 English and French as first language: 0%
 Other as first language: 0%

Municipal council
 Mayor: Pierre Lambert
 Councillors: Angèle Auger, Nathalie Ayotte, Marcel Cloutier, Ghislain Desaulniers, Joël Morissette, Serge Plante

References

Municipalities in Quebec
Incorporated places in Abitibi-Témiscamingue
Populated places established in 1918